Make a Pest a Pet is the latest album by Canadian alternative rock band The Age of Electric. The lead single, "Remote Control", was a Top 10 hit in Canada. It is the band's only album to make the Canadian Albums Chart, peaking at #78 in 1997. It was certified Gold in Canada in 1998.

Reissue
In 2016, the band announced plans to release a remastered, expanded two-LP vinyl reissue of the album in 2017 in celebration of the album's 20th anniversary. The reissue was released on February 17, 2017. The reissue included four never before released songs from the Make a Pest a Pet sessions ("Th13teen", "Pass It On", "Blend In", and "Radio One").

Track listing

Personnel 
Todd Kerns – vocals, guitars
John Kerns – bass
Ryan Dahle – guitars, vocals
Kurt Dahle – drums, vocals
Chris Bryant – mellotron

References 

1997 albums
The Age of Electric albums
Mercury Records albums
Albums recorded at Greenhouse Studios